MAN Truck & Bus SE (formerly MAN Nutzfahrzeuge AG) is a subsidiary of Traton, and one of the leading international providers of commercial vehicles. Headquartered in Munich, Germany, MAN Truck & Bus produces vans in the range from 3.0 to 5.5 t gvw, trucks in the range from 7.49 to 44 t gvw, heavy goods vehicles up to 250 t road train gvw, bus-chassis, coaches, interurban coaches, and city buses. MAN Truck & Bus also produces diesel and natural-gas engines. The MAN acronym originally stood for Maschinenfabrik Augsburg-Nürnberg AG, formerly MAN AG.

Trucks and buses of the product brand MAN and buses of the product brand Neoplan (premium coaches) belong to the MAN Truck & Bus Group.

On 1 January 2011, MAN Nutzfahrzeuge (literally: commercial vehicles) was renamed as MAN Truck & Bus to better reflect the company's products on the international market.

History

Light truck collaborations with Saviem and Volkswagen
From 1967 until 1977, MAN collaborated with France's Saviem, selling their light to medium duty trucks with MAN badging in Germany and certain other markets. After the end of this, a deal was struck with Volkswagen which lasted until 1993. Production of a truck using the Volkswagen LT body started in 1979 and ended in 1993 with 72,000 units produced. It was available with four engines and four wheelbases over its lifetime; there was also a 4X4 version called 8.150 FAE. FAE means "forward control" cab, all-wheel drive, single tyres so the F nomenclature means "forward control" cab. This series is usually referred to as the G90, from the most common model, but also as the "G"-series. In the United Kingdom it was originally marketed as the "MAN MT" series. The original lineup in the UK consisted of the 6.90 and the 8.90 (the first digit denoting the GVW in tonnes, the second for power in metric horsepower) and the 8.136 and 9.136.

MAN AG supplied engines which were available in inline-four and inline-six cylinder engine configurations, with DIN rated motive power outputs of:

MAN replaced the G series with the L2000 and M2000 ranges. Several models of the MAN-VWCV and the VWCV LT ranges were marketed in Spain by Enasa as Pegaso Ekus, in a typical badge engineering operation. Peterbilt also offered this model with their badging, as the 200 or 265 model.

VWCV and MAN shared the project development in accordance with the collaboration agreement as follows:

Volkswagen Commercial Vehicles took care of:
the tilting driver's cab including steering wheel and fixing, hand levers and foot pedals, cabins so they can fit the truck chassis
the complete interior equipment and heating
the manual gearbox with clutch and gear lever, the rear axle with rear-axle transmission and suspension
the Cardan shafts including bearings
the electrical system for the entire concept, and the platforms for the standard design.

MAN was responsible for:
the engine including cooling, exhaust, inlet and fuel system
the front axle with suspension and steering
the frame with all parts for attaching the springs and axles, the steering, the batteries, the power braking system and fuel system
the brakes, i.e. for the complete wheel brakes front and rear, the dual-circuit power brakes and parking brake
the wheels and tyres
the platform for special designs and tipping mechanism.

MAN-VWCVs were built in Volkswagen's Hanover factory until other Volkswagen models took priority; they were then made at MAN AG's Salzgitter-Watenstedt factory.

MAN-VWCV Range 6.90, 8.90, 6.100, 8.136, 8.100, 8.150, 9.136, 9.150 & 10.136.

Trucks

Commercial trucks
 LE / L2000
 ME / M2000 evolution
 FE / F2000
 CLA
 TGL, with hybrid trucks (MAN TGL Optistrang and TGL EDA).
 TGM
 TGA
 TGX / TGS – a variant of the TGS model was used for Dakar Rally
 MAN TGE - A rebadged Volkswagen Crafter.
Until 2007, MAN also built the badge-engineered ERF trucks for the UK market.

Military trucks
Rheinmetall MAN Military Vehicles, a joint venture with Rheinmetall, produces a range of tactical trucks:
 HX
 LX / FX
 SX

Earlier ventures with US Army produced the "LD" multifuel diesel engine line used on M35 -ton and M54 5-ton trucks

Buses

Current
 Lion's City, city and inter-urban buses
 Lion's Coach, coaches
 Lion's Intercity, inter-urban buses

Historical

The first integral buses
 760 UO, underfloor engine (1957–?)
 MAN/Krauss-Maffei Metrobus (de)
 640 HO (1959–1962)
 750 HO (1962–1974)
 890 UO, underfloor engine
 890 UG, articulated bus, underfloor engine
 535 HO, regional bus and coach
VöV-Standard buses, 1st generation

 750 HO-SL (renamed SL 192 from 1972), city bus (1968–1973)
 750 HO-SÜ (renamed SÜ 230 from 1972), regional bus (1970–1975)
 890 SG (renamed SG 192 from 1972), articulated bus, underfloor engine (1970–1980)
 SL 200, city bus (1973–1988)
 SÜ 240, regional bus (1972–1989)
 SD 200, double-decker bus (1973–1985)
 SG 220, articulated bus, underfloor engine (1978–1983)
 SG 240/280 H, articulated bus, rear engine (1980–1986)
 North-American models:
 SG 220, articulated bus, underfloor engine (1978–1983)
 SG 310, articulated bus, underfloor engine (1981–1988)
VöV-Standard buses, 2nd generation

 SL 202,  city bus (1984–1993)
 SG 242/282 H, "puller" articulated bus (1985–1990)
 SG 242/262/292/312/322, "pusher" articulated bus (1986–1999)
 SD 202, double-decker bus (1986–1992)
 SÜ 242/272/292/312/322, regional bus (1987–1998)
 SM 152/182, midibus (1989–1992)
 NL 202, low-floor bus with podium-mounted seats (1989–1992)
 NG 272, low-floor articulated bus with podium-mounted seats (1990–1992)
 NM 152/182, low-floor midibus with podium-mounted seats (1990–1993)
 NL 202/222/262/312, low-floor bus with podium-mounted seats in rear part only (1992–1998)
 MAN NL 262 R, right-hand drive version for Hong Kong (1997–1999)
 NG 262/272/312, low-floor articulated bus with podium-mounted seats in rear part only (1992–2000)
 NM 152/192, low-floor midibus with podium-mounted seats in rear part only (1993–1998)
 ND 202, low-floor double-decker bus (1995)
 EL 202/222/262/272, low-entry bus (1993–2001)
 North-American models:
 SL 40-102 "Americana", transit bus (1984–1988)
Post-VöV-Standard buses

 1st generation Lion's City city- / inter-urban buses (1996–2004)
 NÜ 223/233/263/283/313, low-floor inter-urban bus (1996–2004)
 NÜ 313/353-15, 14.7-metre version (1998–2004)
 NL 223/233/243/263/283/313, low-floor city bus (1997–2004) (also known as Lion's Line)
 NL 313/353-15, 14.7-metre version (1999–2004) (also known as Lion's Line XXL)
 NM 223/283, low-floor midibus (1997–2004) (also known as Lion's Midi and Lion's Single)
 NG 223/243/263/313/353/363, low-floor articulated bus (1997–2004)
 EL 223/263/283/293, low-entry bus (2003–2008) (also known as Lion's City T and Lion's City TÜ)
 Lion's Classic city- / inter-urban buses (1999–2010) (unnamed until 2004)
 SG 263/313, articulated bus (2001–2008) (also known as Lion's Classic G from 2004)
 SL 223/263/283 (2000–2010) (also known as Lion's Classic from 2004)
 SÜ 283/313 (1999–2009) (also known as Lion's Compact, as Lion's Classic Ü from 2004)
Regional buses

 RÜ 240/280 (1980–1988)
 ÜL 242/272/292/312/322 (1990–1996)
 ÜM 192/222, midibus
 ÜL 313/353/363 (1996–2004)
 R 353/363 Lion's Comfort
 Lion's Regio (2004–2017)
Coaches

 SR 240/280 (1975–1984)
 SR 240/280 H, high-decker version (1978–1984)
 SR 321/361 (?–?)
 SR 321/361 H, high-decker version (?–?)
 SR 292/362 (renamed FR 292/362 from 1990) (1985–1993)
 SR 292/362 H (renamed FRH 292/362 from 1990), high-decker version (1985–1993)
 Lion's Star (1991–2006, replaced by Lion's Coach Supreme)
 FRH 422/402 (1991–1998)
 RH 403/463 (1998–2001)
 RHS 414/464/484 (2001–2006)
 1st generation Lion's Coach: RH 353/363/403/413/423/463 (1996–2003)

Chassis

 MKN (1948–1950)
 MKN 26 (1950–1954)
 MKN 630 (1954–1956)
 MKH 2
 MKH 4
 530 HOC (1955–?)
 535 HOC (1956–?)
 545 HOC
 558 HOC (1956–?)
 420 HOC (1957–1963)
 10.xxx FOCL (L53) front-engined midi
 10.xxx HOCL (469) midi
11.xxx HOCL midi
 12.xxx HOCL-NL (A76) low-floor midi
 12.xxx HOCL (A77) midi
 13.xxx HOCL/SR (A53) midi
 14.xxx HOCL-NL (A66) low-entry
 14.xxx HOCL (A67)
 16.xxx HOCL (470/475)
 18.2x0 HOCL-NL (A69) low-entry
 18.xxx HOCL (A51/R33)
19.xxx HOCL (R33)
 24.xxx HOCLN (474/A54/R37)
 24.xxx HOCLNR-NL (A57/A59)
 28.xxx HGOCL (A61)
 EL 202 F (A17) low-entry
 ND 202 F (A14) low-floor double-decker
 NL 202 F (898/A29) low-floor
 ND xx3 F (A34/A48/A95) low-floor double-decker
 NG xx3 F (A24) articulated low-floor
 NL xx3 F (A22) low-floor
 NM xx3 F (A35) low-floor midi
 SL 18.xxx HOC (A89)
 SÜ xx3 F (A91)
 Lion's Chassis low-entry, intercity and coach (modular)

Production sites

Trucks
Heavy range
Munich (GER)
Niepołomice (POL)

Light and medium range
Steyr (A) sold to Steyr Automotive GmbH 

Special-purpose vehicles
Vienna (A)

Buses
Ankara (TUR): MANAŞ - premium coaches, standard coaches, double-decker coaches, intercity buses, city buses for MAN & Neoplan
Sady (POL) - moved to Starachowice
Starachowice (POL) - city buses, bus and coach chassis, components ( in future: premium coaches, standard coaches, double-decker coaches, intercity buses)
 Carmona (PH) - bus body under name of Almazora Motors Corporation
 Santa Rosa (PH) - bus body under name of Santarosa Motor Works, Inc. (Columbian Manufacturing Corp.)
 Quezon City (PH) - bus body under name of Del Monte Motor Works, Inc.

Engines
Nuremberg (GER)

Axles and other components 
Munich (GER)
Salzgitter (GER)

Official MAN Truck and Bus importer
Ghana - Van Vliet Automotive Distribution B.V
Togo - Van Vliet Automotive Distribution B.V.
Benin - Van Vliet Automotive Distribution B.V.
Nigeria - DEAL REAL Limited (DRL) 
Burkina Faso - Van Vliet Automotive Distribution B.V.

CKD-locations
Shushary, Saint Petersburg, (RUS): Heavy-weight trucks. 50/50 Joint venture with Scania called Truck Production RUS LLC. 
Pinetown (RSA): heavy, medium and light trucks; bus-chassis for MAN & VW Truck & Bus
Querétaro (MEX)
Olifantsfontein (RSA): intercity- and regular service bus bodies for MAN & VW Truck & Bus
Sharjah, (UAE): Assembling of trucks under the Shacman brand. The company is a part of the Shaanxi Automobile Group.
East Jakarta, (IDN): Assembling of trucks and buses at a plant in Jatinegara, East Jakarta by PT. Duta Putera Sumatera.
Rawang, (MYS)
Quezon City, (PHL): Assembling of trucks and buses at MAN Truck and Bus Center assembly plant in Novaliches, Quezon City by MAN Automotive Concessionaires Corporation.
Bangkok, (THA): Assembling of trucks and buses in Thailand by MAN Commercial Vehicle (Thailand) Co., Ltd. 
Samarkand, (UZB): Assembling of two trucks in Uzbekistan by MAN Auto-Uzbekistan.

See also
 Büssing
 Neoplan
 Volkswagen Caminhões e Ônibus
 Scania AB
 Traton

References

Notes

Bibliography

External links
 

Truck and Bus
Bus manufacturers of Germany
German companies established in 1893
Traton
Trolleybus manufacturers
Truck manufacturers of Germany
Vehicle manufacturing companies established in 1893